Boner is an English and Swiss German surname. Some notable individuals with the surname:

 Alice Boner (1889–1981), Swiss painter and sculptor, art historian, and an Indologist
 Bill Boner (born 1945), former mayor of Nashville, Tennessee
 Brian Boner, American politician and a Republican member of the Wyoming State Senate
 Charles Boner (1815–1870), English travel writer, poet and translator
 David Boner (born 1941), Scottish former footballer
 Gary L. Boner (1940–2005), American football player and coach
 Hylck Boner, wife of 17th century Dutch magistrate Johannes Saeckma, notably the subject of a painting by Frans Hals
 Jan Boner (before 1463–1523), also known as Hans Boner, German-born Polish merchant and banker
 John Henry Boner (1845–1903), North Carolina poet
 Seraina Boner (born 1982), Swiss cross-country skier
 Ulrich Boner (fl. early 14th century), a German-speaking Swiss writer of fable
 William H. Boner (1863–1925), Washington state businessman and politician

English-language surnames
German-language surnames
Swiss-German surnames